

A
Mike Adamle
Frankie Albert
Marv Albert
Lionel Aldridge
Mel Allen
Lyle Alzado
Ken Anderson
Elmer Angsman
Pete Axthelm

B
Sam Balter
Tiki Barber
Len Berman
Jerome Bettis
Rocky Bleier
Lou Boda
Mike Breen
Drew Brees
Jack Brickhouse
John Brodie
Jack Buck
Chris Burford
Mike Bush

C
Dave Casper
Jimmy Cefalo
Bob Chandler
Todd Christensen
Paul Christman
Cris Collinsworth
Jac Collinsworth
George Conner
Bob Costas
Don Criqui
Randy Cross
Heather Cox
Larry Csonka

D
Willie Davis
Len Dawson
Frank Deford
Sam DeLuca
Al DeRogatis
Mike Ditka
John Dockery
Todd Donoho
Jim Donovan
Tony Dungy
Braven Dyer

E
Carl Eller
Dick Enberg
Bill Enis

F
Bill Flemming
Mike Florio
Doug Flutie
Dan Fouts

G
Gayle Gardner
Gary Gerould
Jim Gibbons
Joe Gibbs
Lee Giroux
Marty Glickman
Bob Golic
Drew Goodman
Bailey Goss
Curt Gowdy
Red Grange
Jim Gray
Bob Griese
Lee Grosscup
Bryant Gumbel
Greg Gumbel

H
Mike Haffner
Tom Hammond
Dan Hampton
John Hannah
Merle Harmon
Rodney Harrison
Pat Hernon
Dan Hicks

I
Tunch Ilkin
Bill Innis

J
Michael Jackson
Butch Johnson
Charlie Jones

K
Jim Kelly
Bob Kelley
Dave Kocourek
Bob Kuechenberg
George Kunz

L
Jim Lampley
Jim Laslavic
Lee Leonard
Floyd Little
Bob Lobel
James Lofton
Mike Lucci

M
Bill Macatee
John Madden
Paul Maguire
Dave Marash
Harvey Martin
Will McDonough
Liam McHugh
Don Meredith
Joel Meyers
Al Michaels
Sam Milburn
Joe Montana
Jim E. Mora
Johnny Morris
Jon Morris

N
Joe Namath
Sam Nover

O
Bart Oates
Bill O'Donnell
Keith Olbermann
Merlin Olsen

P
Bill Parcells
Dan Patrick
Ed Podolak
Ross Porter
Mel Proctor

R
Jay Randolph
George Ratterman
Ahmad Rashad
Fred Roggin
Spencer Ross
Kyle Rote
Dave Rowe
Beasley Reece
Reggie Rucker
Sam Rutigliano
Tim Ryan

S
Chris Schenkel
Mark Scott
Ray Scott
Gayle Sierens
Chris Simms
Phil Simms
Jim Simpson
O. J. Simpson
Kevin Slaten
Gordy Soltau
Melissa Stark
Bill Stern
Dick Stockton
Phil Stone
Hannah Storm
Pat Summerall
Bill Symes

T
Michele Tafoya
Kathryn Tappen
Maria Taylor
Chuck Thompson
Mike Tirico
Bob Trumpy
Joe Tucker
Jim Turner

V
Matt Vasgersian

W
Bill Walsh
Paul Warfield
Gene Washington
Mike Webster
Bill Wilkerson
Bud Wilkinson
Harry Wismer
Bob Wolff
Sam Wyche

Z
Paul Zimmerman

See also
NFL on NBC
Football Night in America
NBC Sunday Night Football

References

NBC announcers
Announcers